Sympathy is the perception, understanding, and reaction to the distress or need of another life form.

Sympathy may also refer to:

Music
Sympathy (band), a Canadian blackened death metal band
Sympathy (music), a short piece of instrumental music

Albums
Sympathy (Raphe Malik album), 2004
sympathy (Hitomi Takahashi album), 2006
Sympathy, a 1980 album by John Miles

Songs
"Sympathy" (Goo Goo Dolls song), 2003 
"Sympathy" (Rare Bird song), 1970, later covered by The Family Dogg, Marillion and Toyah
"Sympathy" (Uriah Heep song), 1976 
"Sympathy", a song by Die Monster Die from the 1994 album Withdrawal Method
"Sympathy", a song by Sleater-Kinney from the 2002 album One Beat
"Sympathy", a song by Billy Talent from the 2006 album Billy Talent II
"Sympathy", a song by Vampire Weekend from the 2019 album Father of the Bride
"Sympathy", a song by Tremonti from the 2015 album Cauterize

Other uses
"Sympathy" (poem), by Paul Laurence Dunbar, 1899
Sympathy, a supernatural connection between a mantic event and a real circumstance prophesied in Greek divination

See also

Sympathetic (disambiguation)
Empathy (disambiguation)
Superficial sympathy, or crocodile tears
Sympathy pain, symptoms of the Couvade syndrome
Kinesthetic sympathy, an attachment to objects in hand not felt for them out of sight
"The Power of Sympathy", a novel by William Hill Brown